Michael Ball is a British music entertainment television programme presented by Michael Ball that aired on ITV from July 1993 to December 1995.

Format
Each episode featured 2 special guests singing live in the studio. The guests were introduced as being "one of the best" within their genre of music which resulted in some high-profile guests like Ray Charles, James Brown, The Bee Gees and Take That to name a few. The show also featured performances from its host Michael Ball.

Transmissions

Guests

Season 1

Season 2

Christmas special

References

External links

1993 British television series debuts
1995 British television series endings
1990s British music television series
Carlton Television
English-language television shows
Television series by ITV Studios